HMS Gannet was a river gunboat of the Royal Navy built by Yarrow Shipbuilders in 1927 for Yangtze Patrol.

Originally functioning in the area of Hong Kong, Gannet was damaged by Japanese aircraft and went to the Chinese wartime capital Chongqing for repair. The gunboat and its sister ship Peterel were chosen by the British to be presents for China, and the transfers were made in February 1942. The following month, both gunboats officially joined the Republic of China Navy (ROCN) and Gannet was renamed as Ying Shan (英山, literal translation = British Mountain).

The gunboat served with the ROCN until 30 November 1949, when the ROCN Riverine Flotilla commander defected to advancing communist force that blocked the Yangtze River, taking seven boats to the communist side, including Ying San. After joining the People's Liberation Army Navy (PLAN), the gunboat was once again renamed Nu River.

She served until being retired in 1975.

References

Publications
 

 

Gunboats of the Royal Navy
World War II patrol boats of the United Kingdom
Ships of the Republic of China Navy
Ships of the People's Liberation Army Navy
1927 ships